Zorilispe is a genus of beetles in the family Cerambycidae, containing the following species:

 Zorilispe acutipennis Pascoe, 1865
 Zorilispe albosetosa Breuning, 1939
 Zorilispe flavoapicalis Breuning, 1939
 Zorilispe fulvisparsa Pascoe, 1865
 Zorilispe seriepunctata Breuning, 1939
 Zorilispe spinipennis Breuning, 1939
 Zorilispe sumatrana Breuning, 1939
 Zorilispe tonkinensis Breuning, 1956

References

Apomecynini